King, Queen, Joker is a 1921 American silent feature farce written and directed by Sydney Chaplin, the elder half-brother of Charlie Chaplin. The picture was produced by Famous Players-Lasky and distributed through Paramount Pictures. The film was shot in England, France, and the United States.

Less than a reel of this film, the barbershop sequence, survives at the British Film Institute. It was included in the 2011 Criterion DVD special two disc edition release of The Great Dictator.

Plot
Based upon a description in a film publication, an imaginary kingdom is in a state of unrest due to the extravagance and oppression of the king, who refuses to sign a people's charter. A humorous barber who resembles the king falls in with some terrorists and agrees to take the king's place after he is kidnapped. The barber then plays the king, and there are several humorous episodes. The real king escapes and the barber is sentenced to be shot, but is saved by the queen and escapes in a bag. The film ends with an automobile chase and a transfer to an airplane.

Cast
Sydney Chaplin as The King / The Joker
Lottie MacPherson as The Queen / Chief Plotter

References

External links

1921 films
American silent feature films
Lost American films
Famous Players-Lasky films
1921 comedy films
Silent American comedy films
American black-and-white films
1921 lost films
Lost comedy films
1920s American films
1920s English-language films